Cyclone Xynthia was an exceptionally violent European windstorm which crossed Western Europe between 27 February and 1 March 2010. In France—where it was described by the civil defence as the most violent since Lothar and Martin in December 1999—at least 51 people were killed, with 12 more said to be missing. A further six people were killed in Germany, three in Spain, one in Portugal, one in Belgium and another one in England. A mobile home park built close to the sea wall was particularly hard-hit. The sea wall was about two hundred years old, built in the time of Napoleon; critics said that situating a mobile home park so close to the sea wall showed poor coastal development practices. The storm cut power to over a million homes in France and a million customers in Portugal lost power.

Effects 
One million homes were left without power in western France. In the Hautes-Pyrénées, falling trees damaged vehicles, the roofs of houses and barns were blown away, and rocks were falling onto the road. Flooding affected parts of the Charente-Maritime département (Suburbs of La Rochelle, cities of Fouras, Marennes, Châtelaillon as well as Ré and Oléron Island) where high speed wind were registered.

Flooded railway tracks led to railway delays in France and the rail services in northern Spain were also severely affected. 70 flights from Paris-Charles de Gaulle Airport were cancelled by Air France.

The storm also caused damage in Portugal and Spain. In France a  wind gust was recorded at the Pic du Midi.

The storm may have been exacerbated by the spread of volcanic ash from the Soufrière Hills volcano. A cloud of ash from the volcano was dragged over the United Kingdom, forming a visible haze to the north-west of Xynthia on visible satellite imagery.

On March 11, 2010, catastrophe risk modeling firm EQECAT estimated wind losses for affected countries excluding Portugal and Spain as follows: Mean damage: €1.3 billion (approximately US$1.8 billion); Mean insured gross loss: €994 million (approximately US$1.4 billion). One year after the event, the insurance industry loss aggregator PERILS AG published its final loss estimate for Xynthia of €1.32bn, excluding the French indemnified losses.

Response 

Météo-France issued its second highest warning (orange) for 27 February and early 28 February for Andorra, Ain, Ariège, Cantal, Finistère, Haute-Garonne, Gironde, Isère, Loire, Haute-Loire and Hautes-Pyrénées. It issued its highest warning level (red) for the Charente-Maritime, Vendée, Deux-Sèvres and Vienne.

Helicopters were sent to rescue people on their roofs following flooding in Charente-Maritime and Vendée, France. An emergency meeting was held on 28 February by French Prime Minister François Fillon following the effects in France.

Aftermath
The French Government declared the 2010 floods a “catastrophe”. A historical study of coastal surges in France conducted after the storm indicated that there had been no previous coastal surge in France with such a high death toll.

In response to the coastal flooding brought by Xynthia, the French Government announced on 8 April 2010 that it had decided to destroy 1,510 houses in the affected areas of which 823 were in the Vendée and 595 were in Charente-Maritime. The government promised to fully compensate all home-owners, based on the value of the real estate prior to the storm, with the ministry of finance stating that they would pay €250,000 per house. In Vendée of the 823 homes designated by the French state to be destroyed, nearly 700 homeowners accepted the compensation terms by the state with demolition taking place in March 2011. In 2011 there remained 79 people who decided to fight the destruction of their homes via the legal system.

The French Government produced a document called Rapid inundation plan: coastal floods, flash floods and dike failures -“Plan submersions rapides: submersions marines, crues soudaines et ruptures de digues” in February 2011. This plan details the policy response brought about not only as a result of Xynthia in February 2010, but also severe June 2010 flash flooding in the Var Department in southern France that led to the deaths of 25 people.

Observed wind gusts 
Wind gusts recorded during Xynthia storm in France and Switzerland :

Notes

References

External links
 GC Capital Ideas Update 2: Windstorm Xynthia
 EUMeTrain, The Xynthia Storm by ASCAT

2010 natural disasters
Xynthia
2010 meteorology
2010 disasters in the United Kingdom
2010 in Spain
2010 in France
2010 in Norway
February 2010 events in Europe
March 2010 events in Europe